The Minnesota Wildcats were a Tier III Junior A ice hockey team playing in the Minnesota Junior Hockey League (MnJHL). The team played their home games at the 1,200-seat Maple Grove Community Center located in Maple Grove, Minnesota.

History
Founded in 2004 as the Twin Bridges (later St. Louis) Lightning, the franchise was sold and relocated to Maple Grove, Minnesota in 2005 to become the Minnesota Wildcats.

The Wildcats normally played 48 game regular season games, in addition to showcase and post-season tournament games. In 2011, the Wildcats folded and were replaced by the Maple Grove Energy. The Energy would have different owners but would carry over many of the former Wildcats coaches and staff.

Season-by-season records

Alumni
The Wildcats have produced a number of alumni playing in higher levels of junior hockey, NCAA Division III, and ACHA college programs.

References

External links
MN Wildcats Webpage
MnJHL Webpage

Sports in Minneapolis–Saint Paul
Ice hockey teams in Minnesota
Ice hockey clubs established in 2004
2004 establishments in Minnesota
Maple Grove, Minnesota